This is a season-by-season list of records compiled by Bentley in men's ice hockey.

Bentley began its program in 1977 as a Division III program and promoted the team to Division I in 1999. They have yet to play in a national tournament

Season-by-season results

Note: GP = Games played, W = Wins, L = Losses, T = Ties

* Winning percentage is used when conference schedules are unbalanced.

Footnotes

References

 
Lists of college men's ice hockey seasons in the United States
Bentley Falcons ice hockey seasons